Dominique Marcas (8 August 1920 – 15 February 2022) was a French actress. She appeared in more than 140 films and television shows from 1950 to 2014. Marcas starred in the film Where Is Madame Catherine?, which was entered into the Un Certain Regard section at the 2003 Cannes Film Festival. She died in Illiers-l'Évêque, Eure, on 15 February 2022, at the age of 101.

Selected filmography
 Gunman in the Streets (uncredited, 1950)
 Justice Is Done (uncredited, 1950)
 The Lovers of Marianne (1953)
 Women of Paris (1953)
 The Hunchback of Notre Dame (uncredited, 1956) 
 Liza (1972)
 La Marge (1976)
 The Island of Thirty Coffins (1979)
 La Vie de bohème (1992)
 Where Is Madame Catherine? (2003)
 Mozart's Sister (2010)

References

External links

1920 births
2022 deaths
20th-century French actresses
21st-century French actresses
French centenarians
French film actresses
French stage actresses
People from Calvados (department)
Women centenarians